In mathematics, an arithmetic variety is the quotient space of a Hermitian symmetric space  by an arithmetic subgroup of the associated algebraic Lie group.

Kazhdan's theorem
Kazhdan's theorem says the following:

References

Further reading

See also
Arithmetic Chow groups
Arithmetic of abelian varieties
Abelian variety

Arithmetic geometry